Region 5 or Region V can refer to:

 One of DVD region codes
 Region 5, Northwest Territories
 One of health regions of Canada managed by Vitalité Health Network
 Former Region 5 (Johannesburg), an administrative district in the city of Johannesburg, South Africa, from 2000 to 2006
 One of Regions of Iran
Valparaíso Region, Chile
Bicol Region, Philippines

Region name disambiguation pages